Leung Ting (born 28 February 1947) was a student of Leung Sheung and later become the last student of grandmaster Yip Man. Leung Ting is the founder and president of the International Wing Tsun Association.

Leung chose the spelling of Wing Tsun to differentiate his teachings from those of other Wing Chun schools, and to keep them from passing off their style as his own. (There is no standard romanization of Cantonese; the Chinese characters remain the same.)

Among the achievements in his career outside of teaching and writing about Wing Tsun, Leung has been a fight director in some Hong Kong films. Leung was the director and screenwriter for It's a Mad, Mad, Mad Kung Fu World! (大踢爆), a humoristic documentary on the history and culture of kung fu. Leung appeared on episode 1 of the first season of the BBC show Mind, Body & Kick Ass Moves; a 10 part series on martial arts masters of the east hosted by Chris Crudelli. He has also served as head instructor on the board of directors for the Ving Tsun Athletic association from 1996 to 1997.

Background
Born in Hong Kong in 1947, he was originally a student of Leung Sheung, and later become a closed door disciple of Ip Man, This was a claim disputed by Ip Chun, Ip man's eldest son and co-author of the book written with Leung 116 Wing Tsun Dummy Techniques (1981)., but Ip’s accusation was considered closed after a public press conference by Leung Ting and fellow members of the Hong Kong martial arts community in May 2010. Leung has also served as head instructor on the board of directors for the Ving Tsun Athletic association from 1996 to 1997. Leung Ting is the founder and president of the International WingTsun Association.

Filmography
Fight choreographer: Five Deadly Venoms
Fight choreographer: The Brave Archer Part II
Fight choreographer: Ten Tigers of Kwangtung
Fight choreographer: Heaven and Hell
Fight choreographer: Stranger from Shaolin
Fight choreographer: Invincible Shaolin 
Fight choreographer: Life Gamble
Director and screenwriter: 'It's a Mad, Mad, Mad Kung Fu World! (大踢爆)

Lineage controversy
Some of Yip Man's students have disputed whether Leung Ting could be considered a closed door disciple of Yip Man, some going as far as to question whether Leung ever studied directly under Ip Man, including William Cheung and most notably including Ip Chun, Ip Man's eldest son and co-author of the book written with Leung Ting, 116 Wing Tsun Dummy Techniques (1981). Ip claimed "我老豆最憎最嬲係梁挺呢個人！" (My father dislike this person Leung Ting the most!) and also "唔係葉問徒弟" (Leung Ting is not Yip Man's student). In response to Ip Chun's accusations, Leung Ting organised a public press conference in Hong Kong in May 2010 to showcase photographic evidence of his own close direct relationship with Yip Man. Existing photo evidence shows that Leung Ting did appear with Yip Man in numerous high-profile events, including the only 2 interviews Yip Man ever conducted, private lessons, Leung Ting's wedding, and public martial art demonstrations. Leung Ting publicly threatened to initiate a defamation claim against Ip Chun if an apology and withdrawal of accusations was not received. Ip Chun has since been quiet on this matter.

In other evidence, in one of the only 2 interviews Yip Man ever conducted before his death, Leung Ting was mentioned by Yip Man as one of his closed door disciples in New Martial Hero magazine 1972, copy 56, page 31, paragraph 2, line 5 - 教師梁挺係其一位封門弟子 (Instructor Leung Ting is a closed door disciple). Photos from the interview show Leung was with Yip man during the time.

The controversy had been in part fueled by past allegations that a photo Leung presented showing him with Yip Man was altered from a photograph that shows Yip Man with the chief editor of the New Martial Hero magazine. Leung has denied the head change. Other photo evidence shows Leung at Yip Man's funeral with an armband that apparently denotes a rank other than first generation (i.e., an armband that indicates that Leung was a grand-student of Yip Man's rather than a direct student).

Other controversy
On 20 November 2009, Leung was acquitted of a two-month prison sentence for allegedly assaulting his former girlfriend, Regina Lip Sik-ying, a claim which was later quashed. Lip testified that Leung hit her after a heated argument involving Leung's ex-wife. Leung testified that Lip fell when Leung pulled her down from a window where she threatened to commit suicide after Leung refused to provide $5000 for plane tickets and an abortion. On hearing the verdict Leung shouted 'Objection!', and even shouted bullshit'' at the judge during the court case. On 29 April 2010, the conviction was quashed by Court of First Instance Judge Darryl Gordon Saw. Judge Saw ruled that the medical reports did not support Lip's testimony but did support Leung's. Leung was cleared of all charges.

References

External links

1947 births
Living people
Wing Chun practitioners from Hong Kong
Action choreographers